The Alleghany News is a weekly newspaper, published in Sparta, North Carolina, United States. The newspaper is locally owned by Alleghany Holdings, LLC. The paper has its origins in The Alleghany Star, which was first published in 1889, by a man named A. S. Carson. In the 1930s, the Alleghany Star merged with Alleghany Times and became Alleghany News. As of 2016 the publisher of the paper was Coby Larue and the editor was Bob Bamberg.

See also
 List of newspapers in North Carolina

References

Alleghany County, North Carolina
Weekly newspapers published in North Carolina
Newspapers established in 1889
1889 establishments in North Carolina